ErAZ or Yerevanskiy Avtomobilny Zavod, was an Armenian automobile manufacturer in Yerevan, Armenia, mostly known for producing the van RAF-977K (as ErAZ-762) from 1966 to 1996. Plans to establish the ErAZ factory came about on December 31, 1964, by the Council of Ministers of the Armenian Soviet Socialist Republic. The original staff were trained at the Riga Autobus Factory in Latvia and UAZ in Russia. ErAZ was privatized in 1995, and declared bankruptcy in 2002.

History
The company started 31 December 1964, with Minavtoprom (the Soviet agency responsible for the automotive industry, to licence-produce the RAF-977 at a local forklift plant). In 1965, the first team of 66 people was created and in the beginning to serve Russian and Ukrainian manufacturers. On 10 September 1965, the company moved to its first factory. The first vehicle, known as the ErAZ-762 (known as Yeraz (Dream), was built 1 May 1966, assembling parts produced elsewhere. Production the first year was 1000 of the plant's design capacity of 2,500 vehicles per year. They are vans and furgons, which were produced for the needs of the Armenian country and other republics in USSR.

The company built an improve ErAZ-762A beginning in 1969. Production climbed to 6,500 a year by 1973, and reached 12,000 in 1975, due to installation of a genuine assembly line, one of the Soviet Union's first of its kind.

ErAZ designers began work on an all-new van, the ErAZ-3730, in 1971, following the lead of the Commer and Dodge Walk Thru. The first trials models were assembled in 1976; they never entered production, due to a lack of funds.

The ErAZ-762B appeared in 1976.
In 1982, the company produced its 100,000-th vehicle.

Models
1966-1996 ErAZ-762 (762A, 762B, 762AIV, 762VAR)
ErAZ-3218
1995-2002 ErAZ-3730

Gallery

References

Further reading
Thompson, Andy (2008). Cars of the Soviet Union. Haynes Publishing, Somerset, UK. .

External links

ErAZ fan page



1960s cars
1970s cars
1980s cars
1990s cars
Motor vehicle manufacturers of the Soviet Union
Motor vehicle manufacturers of Armenia
Armenian companies established in 1964
Vehicle manufacturing companies established in 1964
Vehicle manufacturing companies disestablished in 2002